Jack Edward Dougherty (born October 5, 2001) is an American college baseball relief pitcher for the Ole Miss Rebels.

Career
Dougherty was raised in Collierville, Tennessee by Geoff and Diane Dougherty and was a three-year letterwinner at Collierville High School under head coach Jeff Munier. In his final season with the school, he pitched
86 strikeouts over 59 innings, finishing with an ERA of 0.71.

Dougherty joined the Ole Miss bullpen in his freshman year as a redshirt, but by the end of the season had emerged as a reliable relief pitcher. He appeared in twelve games, going 2–2 with a 5.40 ERA. In his debut against Austin Peay, he struck out five of six batters in two flawless innings. As a relief pitcher in his sophomore year, he made seventeen appearances, going 4–3 with a 4.91 ERA. Later in the year, Dougherty retired fifteen consecutive batters in a surprise start in the first game of the 2022 College World Series finals, helping Ole Miss to win its first NCAA Championship and earning himself a comparison to Max Scherzer by ESPN's Ryan McGee.

References

External links
Ole Mis Rebels baseball bio

2001 births
Living people
Baseball players from Tennessee
Baseball pitchers
Ole Miss Rebels baseball players